Charles Wells Gipson Jr. (born December 16, 1972) is a former Major League Baseball outfielder for the Seattle Mariners (-), New York Yankees, Tampa Bay Devil Rays, and Houston Astros.

Gipson was a replacement player during the 1994 Major League Baseball strike.

He is one of only seven players to have played at least 100 games and have more games played than at-bats.

As of 2022, he serves as the athletic director of Xavier Educational Academy, a private middle and high school in Houston, Texas.

References

External links
, or Retrosheet, or Pelota Binaria (Venezuelan Winter League)

1972 births
Living people
Appleton Foxes players
Arizona League Mariners players
Baseball players from California
Cardenales de Lara players
American expatriate baseball players in Venezuela
Columbus Clippers players
Cypress Chargers baseball players
Durham Bulls players
Everett AquaSox players
Houston Astros players
Major League Baseball outfielders
Major League Baseball replacement players
Memphis Chicks players
New Haven Ravens players
New York Yankees players
Port City Roosters players
Riverside Pilots players
Round Rock Express players
Seattle Mariners players
Sportspeople from Orange, California
Tacoma Rainiers players
Tampa Bay Devil Rays players